Ariana is a coastal city in north-eastern Tunisia, part the agglomeration of Tunis, also called "Grand Tunis". It is the capital of Ariana Governorate and the country's eighth largest city.

History 
The city's name seems to date back to the period of the Vandal Kingdom in pre-Islamic North Africa: the Vandals, in fact, were of Arian faith. It could also be a reference to Persian settlers from the Islamic invasion of the Maghreb as Persians refer to themselves as "Aryan".

The city's origins date back to the Zirid dynasty. Under the Hafsid sultan Muhammad I al-Mustansir, Ariana became the residence of the Sephardi Jews and Muslim Andalusians, who sought refuge in Ifriqiya in the thirteenth century.

Geography 
The city, whose area covers  hectares, and is the pole of an agglomeration covering seven districts for a population basin of  inhabitants. It is located in the middle of a vast plain bordered by the beaches of Raoued and Gammarth as well as the city of Carthage and the hill of Sidi Bou Saïd.

Economy 
Ariana owes its fame to its agricultural development and to its production of flowers, mainly roses.

The Rose Garden, located in Bir Belhassen Park, covers some 3000m² and is home to  rosebushes and cuttings, 90% of which belong to the variety known as the “Ariana rose". This variety was introduced in 1637 by the Andalusians. The garden is extended by the Galerie de la Rose which develops the historical, natural and cultural aspects of the flower. A rose festival takes place every year in the spring.

Climate
In Ariana, the climate is warm and temperate. In winter there is much more rainfall than in summer. The Köppen-Geiger climate classification is Csa. About  of precipitation falls annually.

Gallery

References

Populated places in Ariana Governorate
Populated coastal places in Tunisia
Communes of Tunisia
Cities in Tunisia